I Will Remember You may refer to:

 "I Will Remember You" (Angel), a 1999 episode of the TV series Angel
 "I Will Remember You" (Amy Grant song), a 1992 hit single by Amy Grant
 "I Will Remember You" (Sarah McLachlan song), a song by Sarah McLachlan, first released in 1995, that became a hit when she released a live version in 1999
 "I Will Remember You" (Ryan Cabrera song), a 2006 promotional single by Ryan Cabrera
 "I'll Remember You", a song by Kui Lee covered by Elvis Presley
 "I Will Remember You", a song by Ed Sheeran from his album =

See also 
 I'll Remember (disambiguation)